Dave Bohman is an American television anchorman and investigative reporter. He has covered subjects such as public corruption, crime, politics, homelessness and public health matters. He was the weekend anchor for WDTN-TV in Dayton, Ohio where he covered politics and crime and military matters. He has been a reporter and anchorman for WPTZ in Plattsburgh, New York and Burlington, Vermont, WCTI-TV in New Bern, North Carolina, WNEP-TV in Scranton, Pennsylvania, WTSP in St. Petersburg, Florida and WPTV-TV in West Palm Beach, Florida, where he currently works as an Investigative Reporter with the "Contact 5" unit. He interviewed 2020 presidential candidate Bernie Sanders and rock star Eddie Money. Bohman was born in Bryn Mawr, Pennsylvania and grew up in the Cape Cod town of Chatham in Massachusetts.

He has been nominated for regional Emmy Awards and won the 2007 Sunshine State Award for Broadcast - Deadline Reporting.

References

Living people
American television news anchors
American investigative journalists
People from Chatham, Massachusetts
People from Bryn Mawr, Pennsylvania
Phillips Academy alumni
Syracuse University alumni
1956 births
The Governor's Academy alumni